Charles D. Luce (April 6, 1820October 11, 1887) was a Michigan politician.

Early life

Charles D. Luce was born on April 6, 1820 in Arcadia, New York. Charles was the fifth of twelve children between Joseph Luce and Betsey Soverhill. As a boy, he helped work on his parents' farm, and excelled in his district school. In 1846, Charles moved to Jefferson Township, Hillsdale County, Michigan where he bought land. The land was initially undeveloped, but Charles constructed a farm there. He lived there until at least 1879.

Career
Luce held many local offices in Jefferson Township. From 1851 to 1852, Luce served as supervisor of the township. In 1854, Luce served as a justice of the peace. From 1858 to 1859, he served as town treasurer. In 1860, Luce served as supervisor again. From 1865 to 1866, he served as town treasurer again. In 1867, he served as highway commissioner. In 1869 to 1871, Luce served again as supervisor. In the 1870's, Luce held the position of Farmers' Mutual Fire Insurance Company. On November 5, 1872, Luce was elected to the Michigan House of Representatives where he represented the Hillsdale County 3rd district from January 1, 1873 to December 31, 1874. From 1874 to 1877, Luce served his final terms as Jefferson Township supervisor.

Personal life
In February 1850, Charles D. Luce married Miss Sylvia R. Brown. Together, they had one son, Ernest M. Luce. He was born in December 1850, in Erie County, Pennsylvania.

Death
Luce died on October 11, 1887 in Jefferson Township.

References

1820 births
1887 deaths
American justices of the peace
City and town treasurers in the United States
Farmers from Michigan
Farmers from New York (state)
People from Wayne County, New York
People from Hillsdale County, Michigan
Republican Party members of the Michigan House of Representatives
19th-century American judges
19th-century American politicians